Eamonn Martin Mary Quigley (born 6 December 1952) is David M. Underwood Chair of Medicine in Digestive Disorders, chief of the Division of Gastroenterology and Hepatology, and a Professor of Medicine at Weill Cornell Medical College at Houston Methodist Hospital.

Quigley was educated at Glenstal Abbey School and graduated with an MB BCh from University College Cork in 1976. His MD thesis was awarded by the National University of Ireland in 1984.

He was President of the World Gastroenterology Organisation from 2005 to 2009 and President of the American College of Gastroenterology from 2008 to 2009. He was Editor-in-Chief of The American Journal of Gastroenterology from 1997 to 2003.

He has an h-index of 97.

References

1952 births
Living people
People educated at Glenstal Abbey School
Alumni of University College Cork
University of Nebraska Medical Center faculty
Academics of University College Cork
Irish gastroenterologists
People from County Cork